Mark Ettinger is an American singer, songwriter, conductor, multi-instrumentalist, and juggler from New York City. From 1998 to 2016 he performed regularly as a member of the Flying Karamazov Brothers under the stage name Alexei Karamazov.

Background

Born in Manhattan, Ettinger started his musical life after taking piano lessons as a child. During his teens, he played keyboards and bass for a variety of local bands, including Joey Miserable and the Worms, The Special Guests, The Hues Blues Band, and David Peel and the Lower East Side. After studying music, philosophy, and literature at Columbia University, he received his master's degree in composition and conducting from Mannes College of Music. He stayed at Mannes for several years as a professor, until he was offered a job as a performer with the Flying Karamazov Brothers.

Alexei Karamazov

In 1998, Ettinger joined the Flying Karamazov Brothers, the world-famous juggling troupe. Selected for his musical talents and theatrical experience, he was dubbed Alexei Karamazov. His first show as a Karamazov was the technology-based L'Universe. He has since performed in Catch!, Life: A Guide For The Perplexed, and the Orchestra Shows, in which he has acted as conductor for various orchestras, including the Seattle Symphony, the Cincinnati Symphony Orchestra, and the Dallas Symphony.

In This World

In 2005, Ettinger released his debut CD, In This World, a collection of original songs featuring a variety of guest artists. The style ranges from folk to rock to blues.

Track Listing

1. Excerpt – the Victrola Mix2. Come Back Home3. Into an Hourglass4. Chester Town5. Hey Darling6. Do You Know the Way Home?7. In the Shallows8. How Can I Be Sad?9. Flickering Flame10. Strange Emotions11. Caroline12. Teacup13. Feed Us All (Papa Ray)14. Lay Your Cares Aside15. No More Sorrow16. In This World

In This World is co-produced by David Seitz (Dar Williams, Richard Shindell, Christine Lavin, Bruce Springsteen). Many renowned musicians join him on these recordings, including Steven Bernstein (Lou Reed), Kenny Wollesen (Norah Jones) and Doug Wieselman (Lucinda Williams).

References

External links

Mark Ettinger's official web site
In This World on CD Baby
MySpace

American multi-instrumentalists
Living people
Year of birth missing (living people)
Jugglers
American singer-songwriters
American male singer-songwriters